Gertrud of Brunswick (– 9 December 1117) was Countess of Katlenburg by marriage to Dietrich II, Count of Katlenburg, Margravine of Frisia by marriage to Henry, Margrave of Frisia, and Margravine of Meissen by marriage to margrave Henry I. 

She served as regent of the County of Katlenburg during the minority of her son Dietrich III of Katlenburg in 1085-?, as regent of the Margrave of Frisia during the minority of her son Count Otto III of Northeim in 1090-?, and as regent of the County of Northeim during the minority of her son Henry II, Margrave of Meissen in 1103-?. She was also one of the leaders of the insurrections against Emperor Henry IV and his son Henry V.

Life
Gertrud was the only daughter of Margrave Egbert I of Meissen (d. 1068) and Immilla of Turin (d. 1078), and as such a member of the Brunonid dynasty. Through her father, Gertrude was a great-granddaughter of Brun I, Count of Brunswick and Gisela of Swabia; since Gisela later became German queen and empress consort (from 1024 to 1043), Gertrude was closely related to Emperor Henry III and Emperor Henry IV. Their daughter Richenza of Northeim (d. 1142) married Lothar of Süpplingenburg, Duke of Saxony and future Holy Roman Emperor. He received the Brunonen's seat at Brunswick. After Henry's death in 1101, Gertrud again acted as regent, this time for her second son Count Otto III of Northeim.

Meissen
Gertrud's third husband was the Wettin scion Henry I of Eilenburg (d. 1103), Margrave of Margraviate of Meissen since 1089. Their son, Henry II was probably born after his death in 1103; Gertude acted as regent during his minority. She was one of the leaders of the insurrections against Emperor Henry IV and his son Henry V. She protected the interests of her sons and Margrave Henry II later secured the Wettin authority over Meissen.

Notes

References
B. Elpers, ‘Gertrud von Braunschweig (gest. 1117): die Akkumulation von Macht durch Herkunft und Heirat: eine übermächtige Witwe in Sachsen,’ in B. Elpers, Regieren, Erziehen, Bewahren. Mütterliche Regentschaften im Hochmittelalter (Frankfurt am Main, 2003), pp. 35-57. 
Tania Brüsch, Die Brunonen, ihre Grafschaften und die sächsische Geschichte. Herrschaftsbildung und Adelsbewußtsein im 11. Jahrhundert (Matthiesen Verlag 2000). ISBN 978-3786814597
L. Fenske, Adelsopposition und kirchliche Reformbewegung im östlichen Sachsen
L. Partenheimer, Albrecht der Bär. Gründer der Mark Brandenburg und des Fürstentums Anhalt (Cologne, 2001). 
O. Posse, Die Wettiner (Leipzig, 1897). 
A. Thiele, Erzählende genealogische Stammtafeln zur europäischen Geschichte. Band I, Teilband 1 Deutsche Kaiser-, Königs-, Herzogs- und Grafenhäuser I.

External links
 genealogie-mittelalter.de

The information in this article is based on and/or translated from its German equivalent.

1060s births
1117 deaths
Margravines of Meissen
Brunonids
Gertrude
11th-century women rulers
House of Wettin
12th-century women rulers
11th-century German women
11th-century women of the Holy Roman Empire
12th-century German women
Burials at Brunswick Cathedral
Remarried royal consorts